Bert King was a New Zealand rugby league footballer who represented New Zealand in 1909.

Playing career
King made his debut for Wellington in Game Two between Wellington and Auckland during the inaugural 1908 rugby league season in New Zealand.

In 1909 he was selected as part of the New Zealand tour of Australia. On tour, King played in all three test matches against Australia.

References

Living people
New Zealand rugby league players
New Zealand national rugby league team players
Wellington rugby league team players
Rugby league props
Place of birth missing (living people)
Year of birth missing (living people)